The 1967 Maine Black Bears football team was an American football team that represented the University of Maine as a member of the Yankee Conference during the 1967 NCAA College Division football season. In its first season under head coach Walter Abbott, the team compiled a 0–8 record (0–5 against conference opponents) and finished last in the Yankee Conference. Donald White and Keith Kalman were the team captains.

Schedule

References

Maine
Maine Black Bears football seasons
College football winless seasons
Maine Black Bears football